Eydhafushi (Dhivehi: އޭދަފުށި) is the capital of Baa Atoll. The island is geographically located at the southern edge of Baa Atoll (Southern Maalhosmadulu Atoll or Maalhosmadulu Dhekunuburi). It has the highest population in the atoll and most of the government offices and public facilities.

History 
Little is known about the history of Eydhafushi. The island's current population has been pretty recent, with estimated immigration of nearby islanders from the 17th–19th century.

In the 1968, people from the nearby Maaddoo island, Funadhoo and Undoodhoo were immigrated to Eydhafushi under the supervision of the Maldivian government as they sought a better standard of living.

Geography

Eydhafushi is located at 05° 06' 10" north latitude and 73° 05' 15" east longitude. After land reclamation, the total area of Eydhafushi is now , including the part of the island expanded in 2015 by reclaiming the lagoon surrounding the island.

Ecology
One of the growing issues at Eydhafushi is the rising temperatures. The island is sometimes referred by people as "hell" due to the extremely high temperatures, especially during mid-day. Due to lack of living space, in the past trees at homes were cut down. Recently, the tall trees on the streets were also cut down to lay tar on the main roads. There were no sufficient greening programs held to make up for the cutting down of trees, hence resulting in dusty streets and growing temperatures.

Even after the reclamation project, there were no greening programs conducted to overcome the issue of the rising temperatures. Soneva Fushi resort planted trees at the island’s harbour a few years ago. However, the program did not proceed smoothly due to lack of proficient support.

Demography

Governance 
Eydhafushi shares a parliamentary district with Hithaadhoo and Maalhos called Eydhafushi Dhaairaa. The current member of parliament is Mr. Ahmed Saleem (Redwave Saleem) elected as a member of PPM.

Municipal Council 
The island is administered by 5 elected councillors who are elected for a term of 3 years. The current members were elected from the Maldivian Democratic Party (MDP), and Progressive Party of Maldives (PPM).

Atoll Council 
The atoll is administered by 3 councillors. All of them represent the Maldivian Democratic Party (MDP).

Economy

Fishing 
In the past, fishing was the major income generator for the local people. However, the tourism industry has grown at an immense rate in the last few years leading to an increase in employment of young people offering good competitive salaries.

Retail 
Eydhafushi has more than 20 shops and markets that serve the island population along with the whole atoll population. These include food and consumer product stores, hardware stores, electronic shops, building materials, fabric stores, boutiques and automobile showrooms.

Tourism 
The island current economy is supported by people working in the resorts and construction industry. With the increasing number of tourist resorts nearby, the local people began to prefer working in the resorts mainly due to the better salaries the jobs offer.

Most of the young people from the island join the resorts just after finishing school. These young people also have the chance to apply to multiple apprenticeship programs offered by some of most well known resorts in the country, such as the Four Seasons Landaa Giraavaru and Soneva Fushi.

Education

Primary and Secondary education 

The island boasts one of the most renowned school in Maldives, Baa Atoll Education Centre. Baa Atoll Education Centre is the first Maldivian government school established outside of Male' was inaugurated on 24 February 1978 by the then Minister of Education Honourable Abdul Sattar Moosa Didi. The school currently teaches up to 12th standard.

Pre School 
Bahiyya Pre School and BAEC provide education for small children.

Places of interest 
 The Dhiraagu communications antenna: along with the Ooredoo communications antenna on the island. Dhiraagu structure stands 400 feet tall.
 Secretariat of the Baa Atoll council: The highest administrative unit of the atoll as a whole.
 Secretariat of the Island Council:(Eydhafushi Council Idhaaraa): The headquarters of the island council appointed 5 members to serve the community of island residents.
 Dhiraagu Operations Center, Eydhafushi
 Bahiyya Pre School - One of the leading pre-schools (Kindergarten) in Maldives
 Ooredooo Experience Eydhafushi
 State Trading Organisation Eydhafushi Branch
 Post office
 Baa Atoll Education Centre
 Bank of Maldives Eydhafushi Branch
 Eydhafushi Police Station
 Eydhafushi Youth Center
 Masjid Al Yoosuf

Notable residents 
 Abdul Wahid Hussain
 Mohamed Jameel
 Mohamed Sifan
 Shafiu Ahmed
 Ali Fasir
 Hamza Mohamed
 Ahmed Saleem (Redwave Saleem) - Managing Director of Redwave Pvt. Ltd. & MP for Eydhafushi Constituency at People's Majlis (2009–present) 
 Ahmed Nazeer - Director of CROWN COMPANY Pvt.Ltd.

References

Populated places in the Maldives
Islands of the Maldives